Tarak may refer to:

People 
 Tarak Ben Ammar (born 1949), Tunisian film producer
 Tarak Chandra Das (1898–1964), Calcutta University anthropologist
 Tarak Nath Das (1884–1958), anti-British Bengali Indian revolutionary and internationalist scholar
 Tarak Dhiab (born 1954), Tunisian footballer
 Tarak Nath Ghosal (1854–1934), birth name of Swami Shivananda, Indian Hindu religious leader
 Tarak Jallouz (born 1993), Tunisian handball player
 Tarak Mekki (1958–2012), Tunisian businessman and politician
 Tarak Ramzan, British businessman
 Taraka Ratna (born 1983), known as Tarak, Indian film actor in Telugu cinema

Places 
 A mountain peak in the Mariveles Mountains
 Tarak, Iran, in Fars Province

Other uses 
 A comb Kilim motifs, symbolising marriage
 Tarak (film), a 2017 Indian Kannada-language action drama film

See also
 Taarak Mehta (1930–2017), Indian columnist, humorist, writer and playwright
 Taraka (disambiguation), the Sanskrit form of the Hindi name Tarak
 "Tharak", a song by Indian singer Mamta Sharma